Kebumen Station (KM) is a large class type C railway station located in Panjer, Kebumen, Kebumen Regency, the railway station is included in the Regional Operation V Purwokerto and is located at an altitude of +21 meters. As the main station in Kebumen Regency and located near the administrative center of Kebumen Regency, most trains passing on the southern route of Java stop at this station.

To the northwest of this station, before Sruweng Station, there is Soka Station which has been inactive since the double tracks was operated.

Services
The following is a list of train services at the Kebumen Station.

Passenger services
 Executive class
 Bima, to  via –
 Gajayana, to  via 
 Turangga, to  via 
 Mixed class
 Anjasmoro Express, to  via – and to  via –– (executive–economy)
 Gaya Baru Malam Selatan, to  via – and to  via ––– (executive–economy)
 Joglosemarkerto, looping train Central Java and Special Region of Yogyakarta (executive–economy) with the destination of:
 
 
 Lodaya, to  via  and to  via  (executive–economy–business)
 Mutiara Selatan, to  via  and to  via ––– (executive–economy)
 Singasari, to  via – and to  via –– (executive–economy)
 Economy class
 Bengawan, to  via – and to  via 
 Jaka Tingkir, to  via 
 Jayakarta, to  via ––
 Kahuripan, to  via –– and to  via 
 Kutojaya Selatan, to  via  and to 
 Kutojaya Utara, to  via – and to 
 Progo, to  via – and to 

Freight services
 Over Night Services, the destination of:
  via –– and to  via 
  via –– and to  via

References

External links
 

Kebumen (town)
Buildings and structures in Kebumen Regency
Railway stations in Central Java
Railway stations opened in 1887